John Capodice (born December 25, 1941) is an American character actor.

Acting career

Television
Capodice was born in Chicago, Illinois. He began his film and television career in the late 1970s. His first role was in the ABC-TV soap opera Ryan's Hope, where he appeared in six episodes as Lloyd Lord. He had  guest roles on numerous other TV series, including Spenser: For Hire, Kate & Allie, Murphy Brown, Knots Landing, Hunter, and Law & Order. He appeared on the series Moonlighting in 1989 and performed as a guest star in an episode of NBC-TV's Will & Grace (episode 1.19), in the role of the plumber who suffers a heart attack.

His most recent TV appearances were on The West Wing, Six Feet Under and CSI: Crime Scene Investigation.

In a memorable 1980s television ad for Polly-O String Cheese, Capodice portrayed Fred, a dumbfounded pizzeria owner, who is asked by three teens to make a pizza with extra cheese, but to hold the tomato sauce, and the crust.  Essentially a pizza, with "nuttin."  He also appeared as a trucker who gives medical advice in a popular ad for Dimetapp Cold Medicine.

Theatre work
Capodice has also worked in the theatre, appearing mainly in Off-Broadway productions. He appeared as a prison guard in the play Getting Out at the Marymount Manhattan Theatre in October/November 1978 and at the Lucille Lortel Theatre from May 1979 to December 1980. The play won two Outer Critics Circle Awards in 1979. Capodice appeared in the Broadway production of Requiem For a Heavyweight, opposite John Lithgow, George Segal, and John C. McGinley.

Films and voice work

Capodice appeared as Doyle in the 1982 film Q and in the 1989 film Family Business as Tommy. Other film appearances are in the 1991 Oliver Stone film The Doors and the 1989 comedy See No Evil, Hear No Evil, where he appears as a police detective. He had roles in Ace Ventura: Pet Detective, Naked Gun : The Final Insult (1994), Speed (1994), Independence Day (1996), and Enemy of the State (1998). He provides the voice of Sidney Pen in the 2010 video game Mafia II.

Selected filmography

 Q (1982) as Doyle
 The Secret of My Success (1987) as Man In KRS Building
 Wall Street (1987) as Dominick
 Spike of Bensonhurst (1988) as Mafia Eater
 See No Evil, Hear No Evil (1989) as Scotto
 Family Business (1989) as Tommy
 Internal Affairs (1990) as Chief Healy
 Blue Steel (1990) as Trial Commissioner
 Q&A (1990) as Hank Mastroangelo
 Gremlins 2: The New Batch (1990) as Fire Chief
 Jacob's Ladder (1990) as Army Officer
 The Doors (1991) as Jerry
 The Hard Way (1991) as Detective Grainy
 Honeymoon in Vegas (1992) as Salvatore 'Sally Molars'
 Family Prayers (1993) as Barber #1
 Point of No Return (1993) as Detective
The Evil Inside Me (1993) as Uncle Lou
 Ace Ventura: Pet Detective (1994) as Sergeant Aguado
 Naked Gun : The Final Insult (1994) as Mr. Big
 Speed (1994) as Bob, The Bus Driver
 Trial by Jury (1994) as 'Limpy' DeMarco
 The Scout (1994) as Caruso
 A Low Down Dirty Shame (1994) as Mob Boss
 The Misery Brothers (1995) as Lieutenant Al Dente
 The Phantom (1996) as Al, The Cabby
 Independence Day (1996) as Mario
 Wedding Bell Blues (1996) as Jasmine's Father
 Dilemma (1997) as Ramsey
 True Friends (1998) as Tony 'Big Tony'
 Hoods (1998) as Sammy
 With Friends Like These... (1998) as Actor Friend
 Enemy of the State (1998) as Older Worker #1
 Ringmaster (1998) as Mel Riley
 Kiss of a Stranger (1998) as Detective Brown
 Simon Says (1998) as Frankie
 Follow Your Heart (1999) as Polo Manager
 A Wake in Providence (1999) as Uncle Sal
 Chain of Command (2000) as Cameron Ellis
 Price of Glory (2000) as Priest
 The Amati Girls (2000) as Danny
 Out of the Black (2001) as Dirk Hobson
 Double Bang (2001) as Frankie Carbonaro
 A Month of Sundays (2001) as Sleeper Man
 Blasphemy the Movie (2001) as Jehova's Witness
 Desert Rose (2002) as Donny Diamond
 The Streetsweeper (2002) as Unknown
 Carolina (2003) as Ernie, The Cook
 Shut Up and Kiss Me (2004) as Mr. Grummace
 Jesus, Mary and Joey (2005) as Joey Vitello Sr.
 Everybody Hates Chris (2005) as Bus Driver
 10th & Wolf (2006) as Sipio
 Cattle Call (2006) as Public Defender
 CSI: Crime Scene Investigation (2007-2008, TV Series) as Lou Gedda
 Dark Room Theater (2009) as Sam
 Detention (2010) as Workman 1
 Pizza with Bullets (2010) as Mr. Tortellini
 Last Call (2012) as Joe 'Jo-Jo'
 Miami or Bust: A Hoboken Bet (2012) as Mr. Cacciatore
 Sharkskin (2015) as Don Piano
 Frank and Ava (2018) as Lee
 Lost Angelas (2019) as Detective Ed Robles

Note

References

External links

1941 births
Male actors from Chicago
American male film actors
American male television actors
Living people